Ethan James Santos (born 22 December 1998) is a Gibraltarian semi-professional footballer who currently plays as a defender for Lynx, on loan from Manchester 62, and the Gibraltar national football team.

International career
Having been called up numerous times previously, Santos made his international debut for Gibraltar on 27 March 2021 in a 2022 FIFA World Cup qualifying game against Montenegro.

Career statistics

International

References

1998 births
Living people
Gibraltarian footballers
Gibraltar international footballers
Association football defenders
Manchester 62 F.C. players
Mons Calpe S.C. players
Gibraltar Premier Division players